Monte Tamaro is a mountain of the Lugano Prealps, overlooking Lake Maggiore in the Swiss canton of Ticino. Reaching a height of 1,962 metres above sea level, it is the highest summit of the chain located between Lake Maggiore and Lake Lugano, which also includes Monte Lema. It is also the most prominent summit of the canton.

SOIUSA classification 

According to the SOIUSA (International Standardized Mountain Subdivision of the Alps) the mountain can be classified in the following way:
 main part = Western Alps
 major sector = North Western Alps
 section = Lugano Prealps
 subsection = Prealpi Varesine
 supergroup = Catena Tamaro-Gambarogno-Lema
 group = Gruppo del Tamaro
 subgroup = Massiccio del Tamaro
 code = I/B-11.II-A.1.a

See also
List of most isolated mountains of Switzerland

Notes

External links

 Monte Tamaro cable car
 Monte Tamaro on Hikr

Mountains of the Alps
Mountains of Switzerland
Cable cars in Switzerland
One-thousanders of Switzerland
Mountains of Ticino
Lugano Prealps